Clark Island is an island of Massachusetts, located in the Otis Reservoir in Tolland State Forest.

References

Lake islands of Massachusetts
Islands of Berkshire County, Massachusetts
Islands of Hampden County, Massachusetts
Uninhabited islands of Massachusetts
Islands of Massachusetts